Areoligeraceae is an extinct family of dinoflagellates in the order Gonyaulacales.

References

External links
 

Gonyaulacales
Algae families
Dinoflagellate families